Gully Rowdy is a 2021 Indian Telugu-language romantic action comedy film directed by G. Nageswara Reddy. Produced by Kona Venkat, M. V. V. Satyanarayana under Kona Film Corporation and MVV Cinemas, the film features Sundeep Kishan, Neha Shetty, Rajendra Prasad in primary roles. The music was composed by Sai Karthik–Ram Miriyala. It was released on 17 September 2021.

Plot 
This movie is shot in the city of Vizag, where Vasu and Head-constable Pattapagalu Venkatrao are seen on the beach, pointed with a gun by CI Raghu Nayak. Vasu rewinds his memories and it is found that he is a topper in his childhood. But his grandfather, Meesala Simhachalam, is a rowdy who makes settlements for the good of the people. This irritates Bairagi Naidu, whose plan is to take over Vizag in his hands. For this reason, Bairagi makes many land settlements, which makes Simhachalam very angry, but cannot do anything as his power is more than Simachalam's power. Then, Naidu suggests Simhachalam that make his grandson rowdy, because his son has died in a car accident. This frustrates Vasu but accepts for his grandfather's sake.

After years of training, he is said that he has become rowdy and ready to do settlements like his grandfather. He falls in love with a software employee, Sahitya, who is the daughter of Venkatrao. The family of Venkatrao is a middle-class family and Venkatrao cannot afford his son's higher studies and his daughter's marriage. Soon they hear that his land was to be purchased by someone for 2cr. But this land is being occupied by Bairagi Naidu. Venkatrao then asks Naidu about his land, but he ended with only 50k, and torture kept by Bairagi Naidu's son Nanda. Vasu knows that Sahitya's family is in a trouble and tries to help them. Vasu and Venkatrao's family help in kidnapping Bairagi and taking the money from him. While doing so, they are unfortunately caught by Bairagi, but someone shoots Bairagi to death. Taking advantage they take the money from Bairagi and run away in a hurry, leaving some pieces of evidence. CI Raghu Nayak, who has been suspended due to his reckless behavior, is being joined by the command of the officials. He collected the proofs like Sahitya's shoe, fingerprints, spectacles, and some hair and were handed to the forensic lab.

Meanwhile, Simhachalam learns that Bairagi Naidu isn't killed by Vasu and becomes upset. Venkatrao's family and Vasu discover Raghu Nayak is the son of the second wife of Bairagi Naidu, which is a secret nobody knows. Venkatrao tries to manipulate the pieces of evidence at the forensic lab but Nayak learns that Vasu killed his father and arrests him and Venkatrao has a hand in this murder. Nanda catches Venkatrao's family and blackmails Vasu.

In the present, it is seen that Vasu and Venkatrao are about to be shot, but Vasu escapes from Nayak and says him that Nanda had killed his father. Vasu, Nayak, and Venkatrao go to Nanda and Vasu rescues Venkatrao's family. Nanda is shot dead by Raghu Nayak and he still thinks that Nanda had killed his father, but it is Vasu who killed Naidu but keeps it a secret. Vasu even knows that his father did not die in an accident, instead that accident is done by Bairagi Naidu. As Vasu's truth later spills out in front of his family, he is asked why he is not taking credit for the murder. He speaks about his reluctance about being rowdy and that he eliminated Bairagi as he was a menace to society. Realizing his foolish ways, Vasu's grandfather gives Vasu his blessings to lead his life the way Vasu wants it. The movie ends with Vasu and Sahitya getting engaged.

Cast 
Sundeep Kishan as Vasu
Neha Shetty as Patapagalu Sahitya
Rajendra Prasad as Head Constable Patapagalu Venkat Rao
Bobby Simha as K.Ravi Nayak IPS [CI]
Mime Gopi as Bairagi Naidu
Vennela Kishore as Nemali Babu
Nagineedu as Meesala Simhachalam
Subbaraju as Aadi 
Posani Krishna Murali as Naidu
Harsha Chemudu as David Raj
Sivannarayana as Pappa
Shakalaka Shankar as Ullipayalu Uma
Vidyullekha Raman as Forensic Expert Ramba
Kalpalata as Patapagalu Latha 
Sneha Gupta as item number "Changure Item Songree"
Saurav Chakrabarti as Nanda
Prakash Raj as Meesala Appana, Vasu's Father (Portrait)
Bevin Reddy as Young Vasu

Production 
After collaborating for Tenali Ramakrishna BA. BL, director Nageswara Reddy and actor Sandeep Kishan are working together again, for the film. Sandeep is playing a small-time gangster in the film. The film was officially launched on 16 December 2020 in Vizag, with a pooja ceremony and muhurtam shot done. Principal photography also began on the same day in Vizag. The team filmed for 63 days, as part of its first schedule. Filming took place in Visakhapatnam and Hyderabad. The team wrapped up the filming in June 2021. In an interview to Deccan Chronicle, G. Nageswara Reddy said that "Gully Rowdy is a sitcom on rowdyism", adding: "Although there are action elements, the film is narrated in a comical way. The protagonist is under an obligation to carry on the rowdyism legacy. But he doesn’t like it, so what he does to keep the legacy going and handle his love is hilariously presented".

Soundtrack 

The music was composed by Sai Karthik and Ram Miriyala. All lyrics are written by Bhaskarabhatla. The music was released by Mango Music Company. The first single track Puttene Prema corned and composed by Ram Miriyala was released on 7 May 2021. The second track "Changure Item Songree" sung by Mangli and composed by Sai Karthik was released on 22 July 2021.

Release 
Initially, it was reported that the film will be premiered (released) in a direct-to-video mode on a over-the-top media service. Later, Sundeep Kishan confirmed that the film will be released only in the movie theaters. The film was initially scheduled for a theatrical release on 21 May 2021, it was postponed to 3 September 2021. Later, it was again rescheduled to release on 17 September 2021.

References

External links 
 

2021 films
Indian romantic action films
Films set in Visakhapatnam
Films shot in Visakhapatnam
2020s Telugu-language films
Films shot in Hyderabad, India
Indian romantic comedy films
2021 romantic comedy films
Indian action comedy films
Films scored by Ram Miriyala
Films scored by Sai Karthik